Beef Wellington is a steak dish.

Beef Wellington may also refer to:

 Arthur Wellesley, 1st Duke of Wellington, "The Beef" Wellington
 Biff Wellington, stage name of wrestler Shayne Alexander Bower
 Beef Wellington (wrestler), a nickname for wrestler Brad Maddox